La Prensa Libre (The Free Press) was a daily newspaper published in San José, the capital city of Costa Rica. It was the country's oldest continually published newspaper, founded 11 June 1889.

The newspaper stopped publishing its print edition on 31 December 2014, and moved to a digital format in January 2015. In August 2020, Grupo Extra announced that the newspaper was to cease publication, citing reduced advertising revenue due to the COVID-19 pandemic.

References

External links
 La Prensa Libre, online website

Newspapers established in 1889
Newspapers published in Costa Rica
Defunct newspapers published in Costa Rica
1889 establishments in Costa Rica
2020 disestablishments in Costa Rica